Cyligramma latona, the cream-striped owl, is a moth of the family Noctuidae. The species was first described by Pieter Cramer in 1775.

Description
Cyligramma latona has a wingspan reaching . The uppersides of the wings are brown, with a yellowish band crossing all the wings and a large eyespot on the forewings. The larvae feed on Acacia species.

Distribution
This widespread and common species can be found in western Sub-Saharan Africa, including Egypt and Guinea. It can also be found in southern Africa.

Gallery

References
 Zipcodezoo 
 EoL
 Global species

External links
 African Moths
 Whatsthatbug

Catocalinae
Owlet moths of Africa
Moths of the Comoros
Moths of Madagascar
Moths of Seychelles
Moths of the Middle East